Shukrabad may refer to:
 Shukrabad, Kurdistan
 Shukrabad, Zanjan

See also
 Shokrabad (disambiguation)